Temperance Temple may refer to:

 Temperance Temple (Baltimore), built by the Sons of Temperance in Baltimore, Maryland, US; see History of slavery in Maryland
 Temperance Temple (Chicago), a demolished Woman's Christian Temperance Union building in Chicago, Illinois, US
 Temperance Temple (Los Angeles), a demolished Woman's Christian Temperance Union building in Los Angeles, California, US; see